St. Petersburg-Baltiysky is a railway station in St. Petersburg, one of the busiest railway stations in Russia by volume of suburban traffic.

The station was modelled by architect Alexander Krakau after Gare de l'Est in Paris. Construction started in 1854. The station was opened on 21 July 1857 as the Peterhof railway station.

Overview
The station retains a glass roof over the terminal platforms and is flanked by two-storey wings. The left one used to be reserved for members of the Russian royalty who went to their palaces in Strelna, Peterhof, Oranienbaum. A glass panel on the façade still features the original clock, designed by Pavel Bure, a celebrated watchmaker to the tsar and the ice-hockey players' ancestor.

In 1872, after the railway line was extended to Reval (Tallinn), the Peterhof railway station was renamed to its present form. In 1931–32, the station was reconstructed. A nearby vestibule of the Baltiyskaya Metro Station was opened in 1955. Since 1933, the station has been used to handle suburban trains only.

In 2009, the DT1 multiple unit hybrid train departed for its inaugural trip from this station.

References

External links 
 

Railway stations in Saint Petersburg
Railway stations in the Russian Empire opened in 1857
Dead-end railway stations
Cultural heritage monuments of regional significance in Saint Petersburg